German submarine U-98 was a Type VIIC U-boat of Nazi Germany's Kriegsmarine during World War II, operating from March 1941 until she was sunk in November 1942.

She was launched on 31 August 1940 and commissioned on 12 October, with a crew of 46 under the command of Kapitänleutnant Robert Gysae, operating from St. Nazaire in France. On 24 March 1942 command was transferred to Korvettenkapitän Wilhelm Schulze. Her final commander was Oberleutnant zur See Kurt Eichmann, who took over in October 1942. She was a member of six wolfpacks.

Design
German Type VIIC submarines were preceded by the shorter Type VIIB submarines. U-98 had a displacement of  when at the surface and  while submerged. She had two shafts and two  propellers.

U-98 was fitted with five  torpedo tubes (four fitted at the bow and one at the stern), fourteen torpedoes, one  SK C/35 naval gun, 220 rounds, and a  C/30 anti-aircraft gun. The boat had a complement of between forty-four and sixty.

Service history

First patrol
U-98 sailed from Kiel under the command of Robert Gysae on 12 March 1941, and out into the Atlantic south of Iceland. On 27 March she sank the British 6,695 GRT Koranton, a straggler from Convoy SC 25, with a single torpedo south southwest of Reykjavík. The ship sank quickly; she was loaded with 8,769 tons of pig iron. On 4 April U-98 joined a wolfpack in an attack on Convoy SC 26. She sank the Norwegian 2,467 GRT Helle, and the British 5,122 GRT Wellcombe. On 9 April she sank the Dutch 1,304 GRT Prins Willem II, from Convoy HX 117. The U-boat then arrived at Lorient on the French Atlantic coast on 14 April.

Second patrol
Sailing from Lorient on 1 May 1941, U-98 headed once more out into the Atlantic, this time to the waters south of Cape Farewell, Greenland. There at 04:00 hours on 13 May, she spotted the British 10,549 GRT armed merchant cruiser (AMC) , escorting Convoy SC 30 in fog. U-98s first attack, with two torpedoes missed, as did her second at 06:20. A third attack an hour later was more successful, hitting the AMC amidships and in the bow, although not preventing the ship from opening fire on the submarine, which forced the boat to dive. However, these hits brought down Salopian's radio antenna and fractured a steam line, shutting down her engines.

At 08:00 and 08:50, two more torpedoes hit Salopian in the engine room. Finally at 10:43, a single torpedo hit the stricken vessel amidships. She broke in two, and sank within two minutes. In all, nine torpedoes had been used. Former merchant vessels such as Salopian, when converted for naval use, had their cargo holds filled with buoyant material such as empty barrels, so they could withstand a considerable number of torpedo hits and remain afloat.

The next day Salopians commander, Captain Sir John Meynell Alleyne and 277 officers and ratings were picked up by the destroyer . One officer and two ratings were lost.

On 20 May 1941 U-98 sank the British 5,356 GRT Rothermere, part of convoy HX-126, which had scattered. The next day she sank the British 7,402 GRT Marconi, part of another dispersed convoy, OB-322. U-98 arrived at her new homeport at St. Nazaire on 29 May 1941.

Third patrol
Sailing from St. Nazaire on 23 June 1941, U-98 attacked Convoy OB 341 northwest of the Azores on 9 July and sank the British 5,945 GRT Designer, she also destroyed the British 4,897 GRT Inverness. She returned to St. Nazaire on 23 July.

Fourth patrol
Departing from St. Nazaire on 31 August 1941, U-98 patrolled the waters west of the British Isles, and on 16 September fired four single torpedoes at Convoy SC 42 north-west of St. Kilda, sinking the British 4,392 GRT Jedmoor. She returned to St. Nazaire on 26 September.

Fifth patrol
U-98 left St. Nazaire on 29 October 1941, and returned on 29 November, after a patrol in the Atlantic, north of the Azores, lasting 32 days, but with no results.

Sixth patrol
U-98 sailed on 18 January 1942, for her last patrol under the command of Robert Gysae, and headed across the Atlantic to the east coast of Canada. There, on 15 February 1942, she torpedoed the British 5,298 GRT Biela, originally from Convoy ON 62, sinking her about 400 miles southeast of Cape Race (on the eastern tip of Newfoundland). There were no survivors, even though the ship's crew had taken to the boats. The U-boat returned to St. Nazaire on 27 February.

Seventh patrol
On 31 March 1942, now commanded by Korvettenkapitän Wilhelm Schulze, U-98 sailed from St. Nazaire. However, at 00:47 on 2 April, still in the Bay of Biscay the U-boat was attacked by a Whitley bomber of 502 Squadron RAF Coastal Command with six  depth charges. U-98 crash-dived and escaped with minor damage. She then sailed for the coast of Florida, but had no success, returning to port on 6 June 1942.

Eighth patrol
U-98 next patrol began on 14 July 1942, it took her back to the Florida coast to lay mines, one of which damaged the American 185 tons minesweeper  on 10 August 1942. She returned home on 16 September.

Ninth and final patrol
U-98 s ninth and final patrol was under the command of Oblt.z.S. Kurt Eichmann.

Wolfpacks
U-98 took part in six wolfpacks, namely:
 West (8 – 27 May 1941) 
 Seewolf (3 – 15 September 1941) 
 Störtebecker (5 – 19 November 1941) 
 Gödecke (19 – 22 November 1941) 
 Natter (30 October – 8 November 1942) 
 Westwall (8 – 15 November 1942)

Summary of raiding history

Previously recorded fate
U-98 was originally thought to have been sunk on 19 November 1942 southwest of Cape St. Vincent, by a Lockheed Hudson of 608 Squadron.  was the victim—she was severely damaged.

References

Notes

Citations

Bibliography

External links

German Type VIIC submarines
U-boats commissioned in 1940
U-boats sunk in 1942
World War II submarines of Germany
World War II shipwrecks in the Atlantic Ocean
1940 ships
Ships built in Kiel
U-boats sunk by depth charges
U-boats sunk by British warships
Ships lost with all hands
Maritime incidents in November 1942